İbrahim Çolak also known as "Çolak" İbrahim Bey ("Maimed Ibrahim") (1881 in Bursa – 1944 in Istanbul) was an officer of the Ottoman Army and the Turkish Army.

Works
Milli Mücadele Esnasında Kuva-yı Seyyare Kumandanlığıma Ait Hatıratım, Emre Yayınları, İstanbul, 1996.

Medals and decorations
Order of the Medjidie 4th and 5th class
Gallipoli Star (Ottoman Empire)
Medal of Independence with Red Ribbon

See also
List of high-ranking commanders of the Turkish War of Independence

Sources

External links

1881 births
1944 deaths
Ottoman Military Academy alumni
Ottoman Army officers
Ottoman military personnel of the Balkan Wars
Ottoman military personnel of World War I
Turkish Army officers
Turkish military personnel of the Greco-Turkish War (1919–1922)
Deputies of Bilecik
Republican People's Party (Turkey) politicians
Burials at Zincirlikuyu Cemetery
Burials at Turkish State Cemetery
Recipients of the Order of the Medjidie, 4th class
Recipients of the Medal of Independence with Red Ribbon (Turkey)